Chlothar (Latin Chlotharius; Greek Khlōthários Χλωθάριος; French Clotaire) is a Germanic given name, attested in Old English as Hloþhere, in Old High German as Lothari (Lothair), and reconstructed in Frankish as *Hlodhari. It means "famous warrior", as a combination of the Germanic root hlut- (lauded, famous) and the word heri (army, warrior).

It can refer to the following kings of the Franks:

 Chlothar I (497–561)
 Chlothar II (584–629)
 Chlothar III (652–673)
 Chlothar IV (died 719)

References

Given names